Ndeyssaan (English title: The Price of Forgiveness) is a 2001 French / Senegalese film.

The name of film
The word "Ndeyssaan" is an exclamation expressing love and surprise in Wolof language.

Synopsis
For too long, a strange mist has covered a fishing village. In this atmosphere, favorable to enhancing fear and superstitions, Yatma and Mbanick, two childhood friends, compete to seduce Maxoye. Mbanick, the son of a marabout, challenges the spirits and manages to make the mist disappear. The entire village honors him; the inhabitants revive under the sun's warm rays. The fishermen return to the sea, the market recovers its colors. Maxoye and Mbanick make their relationship public. However, Yatma does not accept Mbanick's newfound popularity. A deadly fight ensues between them.

Cast 
 Hubert Koundé - Yatma
 Rokhaya Niang - Maxoye
 Gora Seck - Mbanik
 Alioune Ndiaye - Amul Yaakaar
 Nar Sene - Peer
 Thierno Ndiaye Doss - Adu Seck

Awards
 Cartago 2002
 Fribourg 2002

Bibliography
 Ndeysaan - The Price of Forgiveness, California Newsreel, Access date: 16 May 2022
 Ndeysaan (The Price of Forgiveness), Educational Media Reviews Online, Access date: 16 May 2022

References

External links

 

2001 films
French drama films
Senegalese drama films
Films set in pre-colonial sub-Saharan Africa
2000s French films